Gidginbung is a town community in the north eastern part of the Riverina and situated about 18 kilometres north west of Temora and 50 kilometres south east of West Wyalong.

Gidginbung Post Office opened on 1 October 1891 and closed in 1978.

Notes and references

External links

Towns in the Riverina
Towns in New South Wales
Temora Shire